The National Unity Government of the Republic of the Union of Myanmar (abbreviated NUG) is a Myanmar government in exile formed by the Committee Representing Pyidaungsu Hluttaw (CRPH), a group of elected lawmakers and members of parliament ousted in the 2021 Myanmar coup d'état. The European Parliament has recognized the NUG as the legitimate government of Myanmar. It includes representatives of the National League for Democracy (the deposed ruling party of former state counsellor Aung San Suu Kyi), ethnic minority insurgent groups, and various minor parties. The State Administration Council—the country's ruling military junta—has declared the NUG illegal and a terrorist organization.

In May 2021, the NUG announced the formation of a "People's Defense Force", and in September the launch of a "defensive war" and nation-wide revolution against the military junta. As of September 2021, the NUG had established representative offices in the United States, United Kingdom, Norway, France, Czech Republic, Australia, and South Korea. On 1 February 2022, the Foreign Affairs Ministry of the NUG appointed  as the first representative to Japan.

History 
Following the 1 February 2021 military coup, a Committee Representing Pyidaungsu Hluttaw (the Myanmar legislature) was created by members of the National League for Democracy (NLD) who had been elected as lawmakers in the 2020 general election. It claimed to be the legitimate legislative authority for Myanmar. It named a set of office-holders of the National Unity Government on 16 April, which included members of the NLD, other parties and independents.

The NUG immediately sought international recognition as the government of Myanmar and gained a lot of support from the people of Myanmar. When the NUG was announced, its designated minister for home affairs and immigration, Lwin Ko Latt, stated that he expected recognition by several countries soon. The International Trade Union Confederation called for recognition of the NUG by governments and the United Nations, and the ASEAN Parliamentarians for Human Rights, a group of pro-human rights lawmakers within ASEAN countries, called on ASEAN to invite the NUG to the ASEAN Leaders Meeting on 24 April rather than representatives of the military junta.

In April 2021, the NUG established Public Voice Television (PVTV) as a media outlet for the NUG, the CRPH, and NUCC. PVTV hosts a series of programmes, including a satirical show called People's Voice TV, and news reports.

On 5 May 2021, the NUG announced the formation of "People's Defense Force" as its armed wing to launch an armed revolution against the military junta, which designated it a terrorist organization on 8 May.

On 7 September 2021, the NUG announced the launch of a defensive war against the military junta, and urged the citizens to revolt against the junta in every corner of the country.

On 6 October 2021, Malaysia's foreign minister Saifuddin Abdullah warned the Burmese military it was prepared to hold official talks with the NUG if the military did not cooperate with the terms of ASEAN's five-point consensus. On October 24, the Foreign Affairs Ministry appointed Bo Hla Tint, who served as a minister in the National Coalition Government of the Union of Burma, as an ambassador to ASEAN.

On 26 April 2022, Lwin Ko Latt, the Minister of Home Affairs and Immigration, announced the formation of the Bureau of Special Intelligence. The announcement also mentioned that due to arbitrary arrests, torture, killings, and other fascist acts by the terrorist military council in the country through the exercise of people's power, the Bureau of Special Intelligence was set up to build national security that would ensure the social security and socio-economic development of the people while preventing violence.

On 7 September 2022, NUG acting president Duwa Lashi La stated that the regime had lost control of half of the country, noting that NUG had formed over 300 PDF battalions, and township public defence forces in 250 of the country's townships, while approximately 1,500 resistance fighers had died since the coup.

On 6 February 2023, NUG stated that it has restored internet access in at least 15 townships where the junta had cut off the access since 2021. NUG spokesman Nay Phone Latt also added that they were providing the access without using junta's infrastructure. On 13 February, the NUG opened an official liaison office in Washington, DC to engage with the American government.

International recognition 
In April 2021, Building and Wood Workers' International announced its support of NUG and called for the international community to recognise NUG's legitimacy. 

In September 2021, in the lead up to the 76th United Nations General Assembly (UNGA), the UN had been expected to make a formal decision on recognizing the legitimate government of Myanmar. Ahead of the UNGA, major global labour unions issued a statement calling for a global day of action for Myanmar, specifically calling on international governments to recognise NUG and for humanitarian assistance to be provided solely through NUG channels. A behind-the-scenes compromise between China and the US prevented the Burmese military's representatives from attending the UNGA session, effectively forestalling a decision to replace Kyaw Moe Tun, the incumbent Permanent Representative of Myanmar who represents the NUG. As of 24 November 2022, the United Nations list of Heads of State, Heads of Government, and Ministers for Foreign Affairs of all Member States continues to list Win Myint as President of the Republic of the Union of Myanmar and Aung San Suu Kyi as Minister of Foreign Affairs.

On 5 October 2021, the French Senate unanimously passed a resolution to formally recognize the NUG as the official government of Myanmar, and sent it to the National Assembly for passage. On 7 October 2021, the European Parliament adopted a resolution that recognizes the CRPH and the NUG as the only legitimate representatives of Myanmar.

Since ASEAN implemented the Five-Point Consensus with respect to the Myanmar situation in April 2021, the military-led State Administration Council has not honoured its commitment to the peace plan. ASEAN member states, particularly Singapore, Malaysia, and Indonesia, have publicly expressed their dissatisfaction with SAC's continued intransigence. In May 2022, Malaysia's foreign minister, Saifuddin Abdullah, publicly called on ASEAN member states to begin informally engaging NUG. The suggestion prompted a protest from SAC. On 20 September 2022, Malaysia became the first ASEAN member state to publicly engage with the competing NUG.

Funding and revenues 
In May 2022, the NUG announced it had raised $42 million USD from fundraising activities, with the majority of revenues spent on weapons and support for civil servants on strike. It has launched a number of successful initiatives, including the sale of Spring Revolution treasury bonds, an online lottery, and the sale of military-linked land and properties. Most NUG donors live abroad, and limited evidence suggests the Burmese diaspora in Singapore is the primary source of funding. The NUG has also encouraged Burmese-based companies and taxpayers to redirect taxes to the NUG, instead of the military regime. The NUG has also launched NUGPay, a parallel digital currency system. 

In May 2022, the NUG raised $10 million from the sale of Min Aung Hlaing's Yangon home on Inya Lake Road. In October 2022, the NUG raised $9.3 million USD during an auction of land in Mandalay's Patheingyi Township illegally seized by the military. In January 2023, the NUG raised $10 million in 18 hours, after a pre-sale of apartments on military-owned land in Yangon. In February 2023, the NUG raised $4 million after an entrepreneur bought rights to a gem mine in Mogok Township.

Office holders

Executives of the Government

Ministries of the Government

Ministers of the Government

See also 
 National Coalition Government of the Union of Burma (1990–2012)
 2021–2022 Myanmar insurgency

References

External links
 
 

Cabinet of Myanmar
2021 establishments in Myanmar
Governments in exile
Democratization
Internal conflict in Myanmar
Organizations based in Asia designated as terrorist
Organizations designated as terrorist by Myanmar